Paul Ballinger (born 25 March 1953) is a retired long-distance runner from New Zealand, who won the 1982 edition of the Fukuoka Marathon, clocking 2:10:15 on 5 December 1982 setting the current national record. A year later he finished in 27th place (2:16:06) at the inaugural 1983 World Championships. He is a four-time national champion for New Zealand in the marathon.

At the 1978 Commonwealth Games he finished 6th in the marathon with a time of 2:17:46.

Achievements
All results regarding marathon, unless stated otherwise

Personal bests

See also
National records in the marathon

References

1953 births
Living people
New Zealand male long-distance runners
Place of birth missing (living people)
Athletes (track and field) at the 1978 Commonwealth Games
New Zealand male marathon runners
Commonwealth Games competitors for New Zealand